William Baxter (4 December 1911 – 20 April 1979) was a British Labour Party politician, building contractor and farmer.

He was a conscientious objector in the Second World War.

Having served as a councillor, he was Member of Parliament (MP) for West Stirlingshire from 1959 until he stood down at the October 1974 general election.

He was asked to stand down by his Constituency Labour Party after the indecisive election of February 1974, when he appeared on television calling for an all-party government of national unity, and suggested that the Duke of Edinburgh could chair its meetings.

In 1961, as a protest against bipartisan support for British nuclear weapons, he voted against the Royal Air Force, Royal Navy, and British Army Estimates in the House of Commons, and was suspended from the Labour Party Whip from March 1961 until May 1963.

Baxter received an Honorary Doctorate from Heriot-Watt University in 1976.

References 

Times Guide to the House of Commons February 1974

External links 
 

1911 births
1979 deaths
Scottish conscientious objectors
Scottish Labour MPs
UK MPs 1959–1964
UK MPs 1964–1966
UK MPs 1966–1970
UK MPs 1970–1974
UK MPs 1974
20th-century Scottish farmers
20th-century Scottish businesspeople
Scottish Labour councillors
Members of the Parliament of the United Kingdom for Stirling constituencies